Susan Albright is a journalist in Minneapolis, Minnesota. She is the managing editor of MinnPost.com.

Joel Kramer, editor and CEO of MinnPost, announced her appointment in February 2008.

According to MinnPost, "Susan Albright, former editor of the Star Tribune's editorial pages, ... has held editing positions at the Louisville Times and the Syracuse Herald-Journal, and was editorial page editor for the Arizona Daily Star in Tucson." She  started out studying literature and music before going into journalism via Syracuse University's M.A. program at the S.I. Newhouse School of Public Communications.

Albright serves on the World Press Institute's board of directors and its executive board. Her articles about the craft of editorial writing include “Sights and Sounds of a Newspaper’s Editorials” in Nieman Reports, Winter 2006. She is one of the authors of the book "Beyond Argument, a Handbook for Editorial Writers," published by the National Conference of Editorial Writers (now AOJ), and Scripps Howard Foundation.

She served as a juror for the Pulitzer Prizes in 1998, 1999, 2013, and 2014; has served several times as a Blue Ribbon judge for the California Newspaper Publishers Association's annual journalism contest; and has appeared several times as a regional commenter on PBS' "NewsHour."

When Albright left the position of Editor of the Editorial Pages at the Star Tribune in October 2007, publisher Chris Harte said in a memo to staff, 
"Susan has ably guided the Star Tribune editorial pages with the highest integrity since 1993, and I have the utmost respect for her as a journalist and an editorialist. She is a nationally recognized leader among editorial writers and a former president of the National Conference of Editorial Writers (now the Association of Opinion Journalists).

"Under her leadership, the Star Tribune editorial staff has won numerous editorial, op-ed and cartooning awards. In 2001 her staff conceived and launched the Sunday Op Ex section, now called 'Opinion Exchange.' ... With all of these fine credentials to Susan's credit, it is all the more difficult to say that she and I have a difference of opinion that results in her leaving. As I moved into the chairman's role in March and then into the publisher's role, it was clear as Susan and I talked that we had different views of the future."

Writing in The Masthead, a journal of the National Conference of Editorial Writers, John Bersia said of Albright in 2008:

"Consider the case of Susan Albright, until last fall the editorial page editor at the Star Tribune in Minneapolis and a former NCEW president. A veteran of the news business, she had been routinely lauded for her effectiveness. Former Vice President Walter Mondale described her as "brilliant, informed, courageous, tough, direct, and nice," as well as someone who oversaw editorial pages that commanded national and international respect. Unfortunately, Albright's vision conflicted with that of the Star Tribune's new publisher and chair, Chris Harte, who desired more locally focused editorial pages. With that, Albright was history; the loss was as much the Star Tribune's and its readers' as hers."

References

External links
http://findarticles.com/p/articles/mi_m2737/is_2_60/ai_n26678331

American online publication editors
Living people
American women journalists
Year of birth missing (living people)
21st-century American women